Orange County Blue Star was an American soccer team based in Irvine, California. Founded in 1997, the team played in the USL Premier Development League (PDL), the fourth tier of the American Soccer Pyramid, in the Southwest Division of the Western Conference until 2012.

The team played its home games at Eagle Stadium on the campus of Concordia University, where they played from 2007 to 2012. The team's colors are white and black.

History

Zodiac Professional era
Blue Star began life as Orange County Zodiac in the USISL A-League in 1997, finishing fifth in the Pacific Conference in their inaugural season, with Gustavo Leal leading the scoring charts. The team suffered three years of middling results, only advancing to the post season in 1999, where they lost to the Seattle Sounders in the Round of 16. The Zodiac played some of their games at Santa Ana Stadium. They changed their name to Orange County Waves prior to the 2000 season, their final one in the A-League, but finished rock bottom of the Pacific Conference, and took the 2000–01 offseason to consider their options.

Drop to PDL; Blue Star is born
The club dropped down to the PDL in 2001 and changed their name again, and the newly christened Blue Star immediately enjoyed success. They finished their first year in the fourth tier as Champions of the Southwest division, but were defeated by eventual championship runners-up, Calgary Storm, in the Conference semi-finals. 2002 was frustrating, with Blue Star finishing a third in the division and missing out on the playoffs, but 2003 was better, for although they finished second to Fresno Fuego in the divisional table, they advanced all the way to the national playoff semi-finals, falling 3–1 to Chicago Fire Reserves at the penultimate hurdle. The 2003 regular season included some stunning results, including a pair of 5–1 victories over Fresno Fuego and San Diego Gauchos, a 5–2 demolition of Nevada Wonders, and a breathtaking 5–4 win over BYU Cougars which featured a hat trick by Ryan Coiner.

 The year 2003 was a landmark season due to the participation of a certain German player named Jay Göppingen, who played eight games and scored five goals for Blue Star. Goppingen was actually the pseudonym used by former Inter Milan, Bayern Munich and Tottenham Hotspur striker Jürgen Klinsmann who, following his relocation from Europe to California, decided he wanted to keep playing for a year or so, just for fun, and to impart his wisdom to Orange County's young soccer players. Klinsmann was born in the city of Göppingen in Baden-Württemberg.

The 2004 season saw Blue Star relocate from the stadium at UC Irvine to the Home Depot Center in Carson, but the change of surroundings didn't stop them from winning their second divisional title in style, finishing four points ahead of second-place Fresno Fuego, and losing just 3 regular season games all season. Blue Star enjoyed a number of free-scoring victories, putting five past Nevada Wonders in mid May, and topping rivals Southern California Seahorses 4–2 in June. The playoffs saw them take care of Spokane Shadow in the opening game, but eventually lose the Western Conference title to Fresno Fuego.

Blue Star enjoyed probably the most successful year in their history in 2005, retaining their division title with comparative ease by finishing a clear 11 points ahead of their nearest rivals, Southern California Seahorses. Once again, Blue Star were the league's free-scoring entertainers, scoring more than four goals on six occasions, including a 6–2 road victory over San Diego Gauchos, and two 5–0 demolitions of BYU Cougars and Nevada Wonders. The 2005 squad included a number of players who would later go on to grace Major League Soccer and the US Men's National Team, including Sacha Kljestan, Calen Carr, Robbie Rogers, Kamani Hill, and top scorer Kei Kamara from Sierra Leone, who knocked in 12 goals in his 14 starts. Blue Star easily advanced to the post-season playoffs where, after beating Fresno Fuego and Northwest champions Cascade Surge, they fell by the odd goal in three to the eventual national champions, Des Moines Menace. Blue Star's impressive early season form also took them to the US Open Cup for the first time since 1999, but they were beaten 3–1 in the first round by El Paso Patriots. Blue Star finished 2005 with the best regular season record in the country, winning 15 out of their 16 games, suffering just one loss, and finishing with a +39 goal difference.

With their conference expanding to 9 teams, Blue Star did not find life in 2006 quite as easy, but they still finished second in the division behind Southern California Seahorses. Playing out of yet another new stadium – Orange Coast College in Costa Mesa – Blue Star started the season strongly, winning four of their first five games, including an astonishing 4–3 victory over San Fernando Valley Quakes which saw them score 4 goals in the final 8 minutes of the game. A strong season finish saw Blue Star win six of their last eight games, and their form continued into the playoffs, where they overcame Abbotsford Rangers and BYU Cougars to take the Western Conference title for the second year in a row, before losing to Michigan Bucks in the national semi finals. Anthony Hamilton and Sal Zizzo were the season's top scorers with 8 and 4 goals respectively, while Sem Lopez contributed 3 assists.

The 2007 season, however, marked the first season when things did not go Blue Star's way. Playing out of their third stadium in as many years – Concordia University in Irvine – for the first time in a long time the team finished with a losing record, picking up just 3 wins all season, and finishing a lowly 9th in the divisional table, a full 19 points adrift of league leaders Fresno Fuego and San Fernando Valley Quakes. The sole high point in a hugely disappointing season was the 3–0 victory over Bakersfield Brigade in early July, and it is indicative of the unexpected slump in form the team suffered that the season's top scorer, Patrick Marion, notched just 5 of the team's 18 goals.

Blue Star started 2008 brightly, hoping to put the misery of the dismal 2007 season behind them. Two wins in their first four games – 4–1 over old rivals Southern California Seahorses (in which all four Blue Star goals were scored by Jeffrey Clark) and 3–1 over Lancaster Rattlers – initially kept spirits high, but things quickly turned sour. Blue Star didn't win another game until July, and during their mid-season drought suffered seven defeats in nine games, including a 6–1 hammering by Los Angeles Legends, a 3–0 home defeat by Fresno Fuego, and a humiliating 4–2 loss away to Lancaster Rattlers in what was that franchise's second ever victory. As July came round, Blue Star were rooted at the foot of the Southwest standings, but three victories in their last three games, including an impressive 3–1 win over Bakersfield Brigade, gave their year at least some small semblance of respectability. Nevertheless, Blue Star finished 8th of 10 in the division, twelve points behind divisional champions San Fernando Valley Quakes. Jeffrey Clark was the team's top scorer, with seven goals, while Tomer Konowiecki notched up four assists.

The 2009 season began superbly for Blue Star, with four wins in their first four games – including an impressive 4–0 over divisional new boys Ogden Outlaws that featured a hat trick from striker David Ponce – and four straight clean sheets for goalkeeper Kris Minton taking them to the first round of the US Open Cup for the first time since 2005. However, having gone unbeaten in their first six regular season games through the end of May, Blue Star collapsed in mid-season, and endured an awful ten game winless streak through June and July that saw the teams fall to a number of comprehensive defeats, losing 5–1 to Fresno Fuego, 3–0 to Bakersfield Brigade, and conceding a late equalizer in the return game against Fresno to draw 2–2 when victory looked to be on the cards. Even their cup run ended quickly with a 5–2 loss at the hands of NPSL side Sonoma County Sol. A final day 1–0 victory on the road in Utah against BYU Cougars restored a little bit of pride for the team which once dominated the division, but it was much too little too late, and they finished the year a distant eighth in the table. David Ponce scored five goals, but such was the squad's instability that head coach Spencer used 46 players during the course of the season, including ex-professional Mike Munoz and Ian Sarachan, son of former Chicago Fire MLS coach Dave Sarachan.

Players

Current roster
As of August 10, 2012.

{{Fs player | no=22 | nat=USA | pos=DF | name=Mitch Boland<ref>

Notable former players
This list of notable former players comprises players who went on to play professional soccer after playing for the team in the Premier Development League, or those who previously played professionally before joining the team.

  Calen Carr
  Conor Chinn
  Ryan Coiner
  Cameron Dunn
  Eric Ebert
  Michael Enfield
  Michael Erush
  Brad Evans
  Michael Farfan
  Irving Garcia
  Adolfo Gregorio
  Leonard Griffin
  Anthony Hamilton
  Jordan Harvey
  Nick Hatzke
  Kamani Hill
  Chandler Hoffman
  Kei Kamara
  Amir Kazemi
  Dan Kennedy
  Jürgen Klinsmann 
  Gordon Kljestan
  Sacha Kljestan
  Mike Littman
  Tony Lochhead
  Drew McAthy
  Noah Merl
  Orlando Perez
  Charley Pettys
  Christian Ramirez
  Robbie Rogers
  David Sias
  A. J. Soares
  Matthew Andrade
  Joe Sofia
  Matt Taylor
  Nick Theslof
  Tyson Wahl
  Martin Vasquez
  Amani Walker
  Sal Zizzo
  Steve Patterson

Year-by-year

Honors
 USL PDL Western Conference Champions 2006
 USL PDL Regular Season Champions 2005
 USL PDL Western Conference Champions 2005
 USL PDL Southwest Division Champions 2005
 USL PDL Southwest Division Champions 2004
 USL PDL Western Conference Champions 2003
 USL PDL Southwest Division Champions 2001

Head coaches
  Erik Kirsch (2001)
  Tom Poltl (2002–2004)
  Nick Theslof (2005–2006)
  Jon Spencer (2007–present)

Stadium

 Santa Ana Stadium; Santa Ana, California (2001–2002)
 Stadium at UC Irvine; Irvine, California (2003, 2005)
 Stadium at Sage Hill High School; Newport Coast, California, 2 games (2003)
 Home Depot Center; Carson, California (2004)
 Stadium at Orange Coast College; Costa Mesa, California (2006)
 Eagle Stadium at Concordia University; Irvine, California (2007–present)
 Stadium at Huntington Park High School; Huntington Park, California, 1 game (2011)

Average attendance
Attendance stats are calculated by averaging each team's self-reported home attendances from the historical match archive at https://web.archive.org/web/20100105175057/http://www.uslsoccer.com/history/index_E.html.

 2005: 109
 2006: 95
 2007: 314
 2008: 79
 2009: 114
 2010: 93

See also
Orange County FC

References

External links
Official PDL site

USL League Two teams
Soccer clubs in Greater Los Angeles
Association football clubs established in 1997
Soccer clubs in California
Blue Star
1997 establishments in California